The following outline is provided as an overview of and topical guide to Papua New Guinea:

The Independent State of Papua New Guinea is a sovereign island nation of Oceania comprising the eastern half of the Island of New Guinea and numerous offshore islands in the western South Pacific Ocean. Papua New Guinea is located in a region defined since the early 19th century as Melanesia.  Its capital, and one of its few major cities, is Port Moresby. It is one of the most diverse countries on Earth, with over 850 indigenous languages and at least as many traditional societies, out of a population of just under 6 million. It is also one of the most rural, with only 18 per cent of its people living in urban centres. The country is also one of the world's least explored, culturally and geographically, and many undiscovered species of plants and animals are thought to exist in the interior of Papua New Guinea.

The majority of the population live in traditional societies and practise subsistence-based agriculture. These societies and clans have some explicit acknowledgement within the nation's constitutional framework. The PNG Constitution (Preamble 5(4)) expresses the wish for traditional villages and communities to remain as viable units of Papua New Guinean society, and for active steps to be taken in their preservation. The PNG legislature has enacted various laws in which a type of tenure called "customary land title" is recognised, meaning that the traditional lands of the indigenous peoples have some legal basis to inalienable tenure. This customary land notionally covers most of the usable land in the country (some 97% of total land area); alienated land is either held privately under State Lease or is government land. Freehold Title (also known as fee simple) can only be held by Papua New Guinea citizens.

The country's geography is similarly diverse and, in places, extremely rugged. A spine of mountains runs the length of the island of New Guinea, forming a populous highlands region. Dense rainforests can be found in the lowland and coastal areas. This terrain has made it difficult for the country to develop transportation infrastructure. In some areas, planes are the only mode of transport. After being ruled by three external powers since 1884, Papua New Guinea gained its independence from Australia in 1975.

General reference 

 Pronunciation: /ˈpæpwə njuː ˈɡɪni/
 Common English country name:  Papua New Guinea
 Official English country name:  The Independent State of Papua New Guinea
 Adjectives: Papua New Guinean
 Demonym(s): Papua New Guinean
 Etymology: Name of Papua New Guinea
 International rankings of Papua New Guinea
 ISO country codes:  PG, PNG, 598
 ISO region codes:  See ISO 3166-2:PG
 Internet country code top-level domain:  .pg

Geography of Papua New Guinea 

Geography of Papua New Guinea
 Papua New Guinea is...
 a country (on an island)
 a nation state
 a Commonwealth realm
 a megadiverse country 
 Location:
 Southern Hemisphere and Eastern Hemisphere
 Pacific Ocean
 South Pacific
 Oceania
 Melanesia
 New Guinea (eastern half)
 Time zone:  UTC+10
 Extreme points of Papua New Guinea
 High:  Mount Wilhelm 
 Low:  Coral Sea and South Pacific Ocean 0 m
 Land boundaries:   820 km
 Coastline:  5,152 km
 Population of Papua New Guinea: 6,331,000  – 101st most populous country

 Area of Papua New Guinea: 245,857 km2
 Atlas of Papua New Guinea

Environment of Papua New Guinea 

Environment of Papua New Guinea
 Climate of Papua New Guinea
 Environmental issues in Papua New Guinea
 Renewable energy in Papua New Guinea
 Geology of Papua New Guinea
 Protected areas of Papua New Guinea
 Biosphere reserves in Papua New Guinea
 National parks of Papua New Guinea
 Wildlife of Papua New Guinea
 Fauna of Papua New Guinea
 Butterflies of Papua New Guinea
 Non-marine molluscs of Papua New Guinea
 Fish of Papua New Guinea
 Amphibians of Papua New Guinea
 Reptiles of Papua New Guinea
 Birds of Papua New Guinea
 Mammals of Papua New Guinea

Natural geographic features of Papua New Guinea 

 Islands of Papua New Guinea
 Lakes of Papua New Guinea
 Mountains of Papua New Guinea
 Volcanoes in Papua New Guinea
 Rivers of Papua New Guinea
 Waterfalls of Papua New Guinea
 Valleys of Papua New Guinea
 World Heritage Sites in Papua New Guinea
 Kuk Early Agricultural Site

Regions of Papua New Guinea 

Regions of Papua New Guinea

Ecoregions of Papua New Guinea 

List of ecoregions in Papua New Guinea
 Ecoregions in Papua New Guinea

Administrative divisions of Papua New Guinea 

Administrative divisions of Papua New Guinea
 Provinces of Papua New Guinea
 Districts of Papua New Guinea
 Local-level governments of Papua New Guinea

Provinces of Papua New Guinea 

Provinces of Papua New Guinea

Districts of Papua New Guinea 

Districts of Papua New Guinea

Municipalities of Papua New Guinea 

Local-level governments of Papua New Guinea
 Capital of Papua New Guinea: Port Moresby
 Cities of Papua New Guinea

Demography of Papua New Guinea 

Demographics of Papua New Guinea

Government and politics of Papua New Guinea 

Politics of Papua New Guinea
 Form of government: parliamentary monarchy (Commonwealth realm)
 Capital of Papua New Guinea: Port Moresby
 Elections in Papua New Guinea
 Political parties in Papua New Guinea

Branches of the government of Papua New Guinea 

Government of Papua New Guinea

Executive branch of the government of Papua New Guinea 
 Head of state: King of Papua New Guinea, Charles III
 Head of government: Prime Minister of Papua New Guinea, James Marape
 Cabinet of Papua New Guinea

Legislative branch of the government of Papua New Guinea 
 Parliament of Papua New Guinea (unicameral)

Judicial branch of the government of Papua New Guinea 

Court system of Papua New Guinea
 Supreme Court of Papua New Guinea

Foreign relations of Papua New Guinea 

Foreign relations of Papua New Guinea
 Diplomatic missions in Papua New Guinea
 Diplomatic missions of Papua New Guinea
 Australia-Papua New Guinea relations

International organization membership 
The Independent State of Papua New Guinea is a member of:

African, Caribbean, and Pacific Group of States (ACP)
Asian Development Bank (ADB)
Asia-Pacific Economic Cooperation (APEC)
Association of Southeast Asian Nations (ASEAN) (observer)
Association of Southeast Asian Nations Regional Forum (ARF)
Colombo Plan (CP)
Commonwealth of Nations
Civil One (PNG) Ltd
Food and Agriculture Organization (FAO)
Group of 77 (G77)
International Bank for Reconstruction and Development (IBRD)
International Civil Aviation Organization (ICAO)
International Criminal Police Organization (Interpol)
International Development Association (IDA)
International Federation of Red Cross and Red Crescent Societies (IFRCS)
International Finance Corporation (IFC)
International Fund for Agricultural Development (IFAD)
International Hydrographic Organization (IHO)
International Labour Organization (ILO)
International Maritime Organization (IMO)
International Monetary Fund (IMF)
International Olympic Committee (IOC)
International Organization for Migration (IOM) (observer)

International Organization for Standardization (ISO) (correspondent)
International Red Cross and Red Crescent Movement (ICRM)
International Telecommunication Union (ITU)
International Telecommunications Satellite Organization (ITSO)
Inter-Parliamentary Union (IPU)
Multilateral Investment Guarantee Agency (MIGA)
Nonaligned Movement (NAM)
Organisation for the Prohibition of Chemical Weapons (OPCW)
Pacific Islands Forum (PIF)
Secretariat of the Pacific Community (SPC)
South Pacific Regional Trade and Economic Cooperation Agreement (Sparteca)
United Nations (UN)
United Nations Conference on Trade and Development (UNCTAD)
United Nations Educational, Scientific, and Cultural Organization (UNESCO)
United Nations Industrial Development Organization (UNIDO)
Universal Postal Union (UPU)
World Customs Organization (WCO)
World Health Organization (WHO)
World Intellectual Property Organization (WIPO)
World Meteorological Organization (WMO)
World Tourism Organization (UNWTO)
World Trade Organization (WTO)

Law and order in Papua New Guinea 

Law of Papua New Guinea
 Cannabis in Papua New Guinea
 Capital punishment in Papua New Guinea
 Law of Papua New Guinea
 Crime in Papua New Guinea
 Sexual violence in Papua New Guinea
 Human rights in Papua New Guinea
 Abortion in Papua New Guinea
 LGBT rights in Papua New Guinea
 Freedom of religion in Papua New Guinea
 Law enforcement in Papua New Guinea

Military of Papua New Guinea 

Military of Papua New Guinea
 Command
 Commander-in-chief:
 Ministry of Defence of Papua New Guinea
 Forces
 Army of Papua New Guinea
 Navy of Papua New Guinea
 Air Force of Papua New Guinea
 Special forces of Papua New Guinea
 Military history of Papua New Guinea
 Military ranks of Papua New Guinea

History of Papua New Guinea 

History of Papua New Guinea
Timeline of the history of Papua New Guinea
Current events of Papua New Guinea
 Military history of Papua New Guinea

Culture of Papua New Guinea 

Culture of Papua New Guinea
 Architecture of Papua New Guinea
 Cuisine of Papua New Guinea
 Festivals in Papua New Guinea
 Languages of Papua New Guinea
 Papuan languages
 Media in Papua New Guinea
 National symbols of Papua New Guinea
 Coat of arms of Papua New Guinea
 Flag of Papua New Guinea
 National anthem of Papua New Guinea
 People of Papua New Guinea
 Public holidays in Papua New Guinea
 Records of Papua New Guinea
 Religion in Papua New Guinea
 Bahá'í Faith in Papua New Guinea
 Christianity in Papua New Guinea
 Hinduism in Papua New Guinea
 Islam in Papua New Guinea
 Judaism in Papua New Guinea
 Sikhism in Papua New Guinea
 World Heritage Sites in Papua New Guinea

Art in Papua New Guinea 
 Art in Papua New Guinea
 Cinema of Papua New Guinea
 Literature of Papua New Guinea
 Music of Papua New Guinea
 Television in Papua New Guinea
 Theatre in Papua New Guinea

Sports in Papua New Guinea 

Sports in Papua New Guinea
 Football in Papua New Guinea
 Papua New Guinea at the Olympics

Economy and infrastructure of Papua New Guinea 

Economy of Papua New Guinea
 Economic rank, by nominal GDP (2007): 133rd (one hundred and thirty third)
 Agriculture in Papua New Guinea
 Banking in Papua New Guinea
 National Bank of Papua New Guinea
 Communications in Papua New Guinea
 Internet in Papua New Guinea
 Companies of Papua New Guinea
Currency of Papua New Guinea: Kina
ISO 4217: PGK
 Energy in Papua New Guinea
 Energy policy of Papua New Guinea
 Oil industry in Papua New Guinea
 Mining in Papua New Guinea
 Tourism in Papua New Guinea
 Transport in Papua New Guinea
 Papua New Guinea Stock Exchange

Education in Papua New Guinea 

 Education in Papua New Guinea
 List of schools in Papua New Guinea
 Papua New Guinea Academic and Research Network

Infrastructure of Papua New Guinea
 Health care in Papua New Guinea
 Transportation in Papua New Guinea
 Airports in Papua New Guinea
 Rail transport in Papua New Guinea
 Roads in Papua New Guinea
 Water supply and sanitation in Papua New Guinea

See also 

Papua New Guinea
List of international rankings
Member states of the Commonwealth of Nations
Member states of the United Nations
Monarchy of Papua New Guinea
Outline of Oceania

Note

References

External links 

 Government of Papua New Guinea (site still under construction)
 Prime Minister of Papua New Guinea
 
 
 Papua New Guinea Business Directory
 PNG Links & Search

Papua New Guinea
 1